The Transportation Corps is a combat service support branch of the U.S. Army.  It is responsible for the movement of personnel and material by truck, rail, air, and sea.  It is one of three U.S. Army logistics branches, the others being the Quartermaster Corps and the Ordnance Corps. The Corps was established in its current form on 31 July 1942, with predecessor services dating back to the American Civil War. Currently headquartered at Fort Lee, Virginia.  The officer in charge of the branch for doctrine, training, and professional development purposes is the Chief of Transportation (CoT) and Commandant of the US Army Transportation School, currently held by COL Beth A. Behn. The Corps's motto is "Nothing Happens Until Something Moves" (https://transportation.army.mil/).

History

Early history

Civil War
During the American Civil War, transportation proved to be an integral part of military logistics through the organization of railroads as a viable and efficient means of military transportation. The US Army centralized the management of rail into the United States Military Railroad (USMRR).  The Army Quartermaster purchased eight City-class ironclads on the Mississippi River in February 1862, a full month before the USS Monitor and CSS Virginia set sail. City Point, Virginia in 1864 would become the largest port operation in the Western Hemisphere in 1864. By 1864, five of the nine divisions in the Quartermaster Department dealt exclusively with transportation. The Army Transport Service was one of the divisions that was responsible for land and water transport. A substantial number of battles were won because of the field commander's ability to swiftly and effectively move troops and supplies. Most wounded soldiers were carried away in a banana-shaped cart called a gondola.

Spanish–American War
During the Spanish–American War, the task of mobilizing and deploying a largely volunteer force to Cuba and the Philippines magnified the need for a separate transportation service within the Quartermaster Department. Army transporters worked with both the civilian railroads and the maritime industry to pull together a successful intermodal operation.

World War I

The American Expeditionary Force that deployed to France during World War I emphasized the need for a single transportation manager. William W. Atterbury, a former railroad executive, was commissioned as a brigadier general and appointed as the Director-General of Transportation and a separate Motor Transport Corps of the National Army was established to manage trucks on 15 August 1918. The United States Army School for Truck Drivers had been established by 9 July 1918; and the Transportation Corps of the AEF was abolished after the war, The M.T.C. subsequently conducted Transcontinental Motor Convoys in 1919 and 1920.

World War II
On 9 March 1942 the Transportation Service was established as part of the Services of Supply.  In March 1942, the transportation functions were consolidated into the Transportation Division of the newly created Services of Supply.  On 31 July 1942, the Transportation Service became the Transportation Corps.  By the end of the war the Transportation Corps had moved more than 30 million soldiers within the continental United States; and 7 million soldiers plus 126 million tons of supplies overseas. From the beginning in England in late May 1942, the Transportation Corps operations in the ETO were directed by Major General Frank S. Ross who had been selected by Maj. Gen. John C. H. Lee, Commanding General, Services of Supply (after the D-Day Invasion called the Communications Zone, or Com-Z), European Theater of Operations.

One of the greatest feats of the Transportation Corps, via the Military Railway Service, was the rebuilding of France's shattered railroad network after D-Day and the transportation of 1,500 locomotives and 20,000 railway cars specially built for the lighter French track system starting With D-Day +38. To speed the process, and avoid delays caused by French channel ports and docks destroyed by the retreating Germans, the Transportation Corps brought the heavy railroad stock across the channel and across the beaches in specially built LSTs.

As allied forces rapidly advanced across France in the summer of 1944, a special transportation operation nicknamed the Red Ball Express was carried out.  The Red Ball Express provided around the clock truck convoys from allied held ports to supply troops on the front in a giant, one-way loop.  There were other lesser known truck-route express operations: the Green Diamond Express operated out of Cherbourg due south, to serve the forces advancing on Brittany and Brest.  Later the White Ball Highway Express operated out of Le Havre to the same depots served by the Red Ball.  Later still, the A B C Highway moved men and supplies from the Belgian port of Antwerp to the front.  The story of the Red Ball Express was told in the 1950s movie Red Ball Express.  There was a short lived television series in the early 1970s named Roll Out which focused on the experiences of a fictional African American motor transportation unit involved with the Red Ball Express.

Cold War
The Cold War between the United States and the Soviet Union extended from 1945 into 1991, spanning the Gulf War. When the Soviet Union cordoned off the city of Berlin in 1948, the Transportation Corps played a vital role in sustaining the city. Two years later, on 28 June 1950, President Harry S. Truman established the Transportation Corps as a permanent branch of the Army.

Korean War
During the Korean War, the Transportation Corps kept the UN Forces supplied through three winters. By the time the armistice was signed, the Transportation Corps had moved more than 3 million soldiers and 7 million tons of cargo.

Vietnam War
The Vietnam War saw the most diversified assortment of transportation units ever assembled. For over a decade the Transportation Corps provided continuous support for American and allied forces through an unimproved tropical environment using watercraft, amphibians, motor trucks and Transportation Corps aircraft. The enemy threat to convoys required a unique solution - gun trucks.

On 31 July 1986, the Transportation Corps was inducted into the U.S. Army Regimental System.

Gulf War
In 1990 the Transportation Corps faced one of its greatest challenges with the onset of the Gulf War. During Operation Desert Shield and Operation Desert Storm, the Transportation Corps working out of ports on three continents demonstrating its ability to deploy and sustain massive forces.

Post Cold War
Operations in Somalia, Rwanda, Haiti, Bosnia, and Iraq have also seen the deployment of large numbers of transportation units.

Operation Enduring Freedom
When the coalition forces invaded Afghanistan, the Transportation Corps opened up the air line of communication into the country and until 2008, a single movement control battalion managed all logistics in Regional Command-East. As the number of brigade combat teams increased in Afghanistan in 2006, the Transportation Corps began ground convoy operations.

Operation Iraqi Freedom
The 143rd Transportation Command opened the port and supported the push to Baghdad in March 2003. After Baghdad fell in April, the maneuver operation matured into a sustainment operation with a hub and spoke supply line. Once the enemy began attacking convoys, the truck drivers responded with an age old solution of hardening trucks with steel and adding machine guns thus making gun trucks and convoy security a permanent part of Transportation doctrine. No matter how great the threat, the Transportation Corps delivered the goods. During Operation New Dawn, the Transportation Corps was responsible for retrograding all the equipment out of Iraq by the December 2012 deadline.

Bases of operations
When it was established in 1942, it was based at Fort Eustis, Virginia.  Headquarters were moved to Fort Lee starting in 2010.  At the time, only seven Military Occupational Specialty (MOS) courses were being taught at the new Fort Lee Transportation School.  For example, Cargo Specialist (MOS 88H), Watercraft Operator (MOS 88K) and Watercraft Engineer (MOS 88L) training remained at Fort Eustis, which is the main housing of the Army's Watercraft.  Railway training for Army Reserve soldiers (MOSs 88P, 88T, and 88U) and Army civilian employees also remained at Fort Eustis, as there are only warehouse tracks and no railway system available for training at Fort Lee.  Motor Transportation Operator (truck driver, MOS 88M) training is conducted at Fort Leonard Wood, Missouri.

Transportation battalions

See also

List of ships of the United States Army
United States Transportation Command
List of transportation units of the United States Army
Fort Story
Fort Eustis Military Railroad
Logistics Proponency Office
:Category:United States Army locomotives
Transportation Corps insignia

References

External links
Destination Berlin: The Transportation Corps (World War II history booklet)

70 Years of the Transportation Corps, Richard E. Killblane
The Institute of Heraldry: 385th Transportation Battalion
The Transportation Corps

Further reading
Durie, William. The United States Garrison Berlin 1945-1994 (Mission Accomplished).  (Amazon.com)published 2014.A chronicle of the US military presence in Berlin.
Bykofsky, Joseph and Harold Larson. The Transportation Corps: Operations overseas (covers WW2) Center of Military History, United States Army, 2003 671 pages Google link 
Grover, David H. US Army Ships and Watercraft of World War II.   Naval Institute Press, Annapolis Maryland, 1987
King, Benjamin, Richard C. Biggs, and Eric R. Criner. Spearhead of Logistics, a History of the United States Transportation Corps. Fort Eustis, Virginia: US Transportation Center (1994).
Waddell, Steve R. United States Army Logistics: From the American Revolution to 9/11 (ABC-CLIO, 2010)

1942 establishments in the United States
Transport ships of the United States Army
Military logistics of the United States
Branches of the United States Army
Military railways
Transportation units and formations of the United States Army